Kishoreganj-1 is a constituency represented in the Jatiya Sangsad (National Parliament) of Bangladesh from 2008 to 2018 by Sayed Ashraful Islam of the Awami League. His death in January 2019, days after his re-election, will trigger a by-election.

Boundaries 
The constituency encompasses Hossainpur and Kishoreganj Sadar upazilas.

History 
The constituency was created in 1984 from a Mymensingh constituency when the former Mymensingh District was split into four districts: Mymensingh, Sherpur, Netrokona, and Kishoreganj.

Members of Parliament

Elections

Elections in the 2010s 
Sayed Ashraful Islam was re-elected unopposed in the 2014 general election after opposition parties withdrew their candidacies in a boycott of the election.

Elections in the 2000s

Elections in the 1990s 
A. K. M. Shamsul Haque died in September 1999. Alauddin Ahammad of the Awami League was elected in a 1999 by-election.

References

External links
 

Parliamentary constituencies in Bangladesh
Kishoreganj District